Rockridge is an unincorporated community in McDowell County, West Virginia, United States. It was originally named Collins Ridge on account of a large shared of the first settlers having the surname Collins. The present name is for the rocky soil near the original town site.

References 

Unincorporated communities in McDowell County, West Virginia
Unincorporated communities in West Virginia